Balibey or Balıbeyi is a village in the Erzincan District of Erzincan Province in Turkey. The village had a population of 182 in 2021.

The hamlet of Sütçüler is attached to the village.

References

Villages in Erzincan District